{{Infobox person
| name        = Adnan Nawaz
| image       = WTTC Americas Summit - Opening Ceremony & Session 1, Adnan Nawaz, BBC World News (15199652531).jpg
| caption     = Nawaz in 2014
| birthname   = 
| birth_date  = 
| birth_place = Peshawar, Pakistan
| death_date  =
| death_place =
| education   = 
| occupation  = Journalist, presenter
| alias       =
| status      = 
| title       =
| family      =
| spouse      = 
| children    = 
| relatives   =
| credits     = TRT World  World News Today  BBC World News  Sport Today   Newsday
| URL         =
}} 
Adnan Nawaz is a British news anchor who is currently working for the TRT World.

Early life
Born in Peshawar, Pakistan, Nawaz graduated from the London School of Economics with a BSc (Econ) International Relations, and then completed an MA in Latin American Politics at the Institute of Latin American Studies, University of London.

Broadcasting career
Nawaz began work at the BBC in the early 1990s, as a broadcast assistant in the Latin American section of the BBC World Service. A Sony Award winning producer with BBC Radio, where he spent five years producing live programmes and making documentaries for 5 Live and Radio 4, he moved in 2000 to TV Sports News, presenting the sport on the BBC News Channel and BBC World News. He has reported and presented from the world's biggest sporting events, including the Olympic Games, the FIFA World Cup, UEFA European Championship, ICC Cricket World Cup, Wimbledon and more.

From 2009 to 2017, he read the news on the BBC News channel and BBC World News. On BBC World News he has co-presented the network's main Asian-facing programme, Newsday'', and was the anchor of the main European-facing breakfast time programme.

In September 2017, TRT World announced that Nawaz was being hired as a TRT World news anchor.

Personal life
Nawaz is well travelled, having lived in the Philippines, Italy, the United States, France, Chile and the UK. He speaks five languages.

He is also an experienced professional conference MC and host. He is the Director of TopCom Media Limited through which he has worked around the world, delivering keynote speeches and moderating panel debates across a wide range of industries, including social, economic and political development, travel, medicine, IoT, telecommunications, sport and leisure, food and healthcare.

References

External links 
 Profile of Adnan Nawaz BBC Press Office, 
 My World Cup Presenter: Adnan Nawaz BBC News, 18 May 2006

Date of birth missing (living people)
Living people
Alumni of the London School of Economics
English people of Pakistani descent
British radio personalities
British sports broadcasters
British association football commentators
English television presenters
BBC World News
BBC newsreaders and journalists
British reporters and correspondents
Year of birth missing (living people)